This list of museums in Lincolnshire, England contains museums which are defined for this context as institutions (including nonprofit organizations, government entities, and private businesses) that collect and care for objects of cultural, artistic, scientific, or historical interest and make their collections or related exhibits available for public viewing. Also included are non-profit art galleries and university art galleries.  Museums that exist only in cyberspace (i.e., virtual museums) are not included.

Defunct museums
 Mawthorpe Museum, Mawthorpe
 Bomber County Aviation Museum, Hemswell Cliff
 Stamford Museum, Stamford, closed in 2011

See also
 :Category:Tourist attractions in Lincolnshire

References

 Visit Britain: Lincolnshire Museums and Galleries
 Visit Lincolnshire

 
Lists of museums in England by county
Museums